Darko Lemajić (born 20 August 1993) is a Serbian professional footballer who plays as a forward for Belgian club Gent in the Belgian Pro League.

Club career

Inđija
Born in Belgrade, Lemajić made his debut for Inđija, on away match versus Zemun in last fixture match of the 2009–10 Serbian First League, played 6 June 2010 against Zemun. He played his Serbian SuperLiga match in the 2010–11 season, against Vojvodina, played on 20 November 2010. He also played three more matches for the season. After the club relegated in the Serbian First League for the next season again, Lemajić collected 21 league and two cup matches, scoring four goals in both competitions. He was linked with Grasshoppers, and was on trial with another club in Switzerland, FC Aarau. Although he also was scouted by Italian club Parma, Lemajić stayed in Inđija. As like as the previous season, he played 21 matches in the 2012–13 Serbian First League season and scored three goals, but also played just one cup match for the season, without goals. During the 2013–14 season, Lemajić appeared on 27 league matches, scoring 9 goals. That score promoted him to the best team scorer and one of the most important players for surviving the club in the Serbian First League. Lemajić also started the 2014–15 season as the first team captain. He scored both goals in opening match for 2–0 home victory against Sloboda Užice. During the first half-season, he scored five goals on 10 matches, missing some period because of injury. After he spent the whole 2015 with Napredak Kruševac, Lemajić returned in his home club at the beginning of 2016 as a loaned player until the end of 2015–16 Serbian First League season. He also extended his loan in summer 2016 for a six months, and stayed with Inđija until the end of 2016. In the winter break off-season, Lemajić rejoined the club as a single-player.

Napredak Kruševac
Lemajić joined Napredak Kruševac at the beginning of 2015. During the first year he spent with club, Lemajić was mostly used as a back-up player. During the second half of 2014–15 season, he scored two goals on 13 league matches and also appeared in both play-off, after which Napredak relegated in the Serbian First League. For the rest of a year, Lemajić scored one Serbian First League goal on 11 caps. He also played two cup matches, against Moravac Mrštane when he scored two goals and was nominated for the man of the match, and Radnički Niš. In the winter break off-season, Lemajić was loaned to Inđija. He returned from loan in summer 2016 and started the 2016–17 Serbian SuperLiga season with Napredak, but later moved on new six-month loan to Inđija. In January 2017, Lemajić terminated the contract and left the club.

Riga
On 25 June 2017, Lemajić signed for Latvian club Riga. Lemajić became the top scorer of the 2018 Latvian Higher League, scoring 15 goals in 24 matches. He helped Riga win both - the league and the Latvian Cup - for the first time in the history of the club.

RFS
In June 2019, Lemajić joined FK RFS.

Gent
On 24 August 2021, Lemajić signed for Belgian club Gent on a 2-year contract for undisclosed fee.

Career statistics

Club

Honours
Inđija
 Serbian First League: 2009–10

Napredak Kruševac
 Serbian First League: 2015–16

Riga
 Latvian Higher League: 2018
 Latvian Football Cup: 2018

Gent
 Belgian Cup: 2021–22

Individual
 Latvian Higher League Top scorer: 2018, 2019

References

External links
 Darko Lemajić stats at utakmica.rs 
 
 
 

1993 births
Footballers from Belgrade
Living people
Serbian footballers
Association football forwards
Serbia youth international footballers
FK Inđija players
FK Napredak Kruševac players
Riga FC players
FK RFS players
K.A.A. Gent players
Serbian SuperLiga players
Serbian First League players
Latvian Higher League players
Belgian Pro League players
Serbian expatriate footballers
Expatriate footballers in Latvia
Serbian expatriate sportspeople in Latvia
Expatriate footballers in Belgium
Serbian expatriate sportspeople in Belgium